The 1993 San Diego Padres season was the 25th season in franchise history.

Offseason
 October 8, 1992: Phil Stephenson was released by the Padres.
 October 26, 1992: Tony Fernández was traded by the Padres to the New York Mets for Wally Whitehurst, D. J. Dozier, and a player to be named later. The Mets completed the deal by sending Raul Casanova to the Padres on December 7.
 November 20, 1992: Jarvis Brown was signed as a free agent by the Padres.
 December 2, 1992: Bob Geren was signed as a free agent by the Padres.
 December 9, 1992: José Meléndez was traded by the Padres to the Boston Red Sox for Phil Plantier.
 December 10, 1992: Jim Pena was traded by the San Francisco Giants to the San Diego Padres for Paul Faries.
 December 17, 1992: Roger Mason was traded by the New York Mets with Mike Freitas (minors) to the San Diego Padres for Mike Maddux. 
 March 30, 1993: Darrin Jackson was traded by the Padres to the Toronto Blue Jays for Derek Bell.

Regular season

Opening Day starters
Derek Bell
Tony Gwynn
Greg Harris
Fred McGriff
Phil Plantier
Gary Sheffield
Craig Shipley
Tim Teufel
Dan Walters

Season standings

Record vs. opponents

Notable transactions
 June 1, 1993: Jeremy Hernandez was traded by the Padres to the Cleveland Indians for Fernando Hernández and Tracy Sanders (minors).
 June 3, 1993: Derrek Lee was drafted by the Padres in the 1st round (14th pick) of the 1993 Major League Baseball draft. Player signed July 20, 1993.
 June 23, 1993: Tim Scott was traded by the Padres to the Montreal Expos for Archi Cianfrocco.
 June 24, 1993: Gary Sheffield and Rich Rodriguez were traded by the Padres to the Florida Marlins for Trevor Hoffman, José Martínez, and Andrés Berumen.
 July 3, 1993: Roger Mason was traded by the Padres to the Philadelphia Phillies for Tim Mauser.
 July 10, 1993: Mark Davis was signed as a free agent by the Padres.
 July 18, 1993: Fred McGriff was traded by the Padres to the Atlanta Braves for Melvin Nieves, Donnie Elliott, and Vince Moore (minors).
 July 26, 1993: Bruce Hurst and Greg Harris were traded by the Padres to the Colorado Rockies for Brad Ausmus, Doug Bochtler and a player to be named later. The Rockies completed the deal by sending Andy Ashby to the Padres on July 27.

Roster

Player stats

Batting

Starters by position
Note: G = Games played; AB = At bats; R = Runs; H = Hits; Avg. = Batting average; HR = Home runs; RBI = Runs batted in

Other batters
Note: G = Games played; AB = At bats; R = Runs; H = Hits; Avg. = Batting average; HR = Home runs; RBI = Runs batted in; SB = Stolen bases

Pitching

Starting pitchers
Note: G = Games pitched; IP = Innings pitched; W = Wins; L = Losses; ERA = Earned run average; SO = Strikeouts

Other pitchers
Note" G = Games pitched; IP = Innings pitched; W = Wins; L = Losses; ERA = Earned run average; SO = Strikeouts

Relief pitchers
Note: G = Games pitched; W = Wins; L = Losses; SV = Saves; ERA = Earned run average; SO = Strikeouts

Award winners

1993 Major League Baseball All-Star Game

Farm system

Notes

References
 1993 San Diego Padres team at Baseball-Reference
 1993 San Diego Padres at Baseball Almanac

San Diego Padres seasons
San Diego Padres season
San Diego Padres